Mappillai Gounder is a 1997 Indian Tamil-language film written and directed by Manivasagam. The film stars Prabhu and Sakshi Shivanand, while Swathi plays a supporting role. The film, which has music composed by Deva, released in February 1997.

Plot
Subramani aka Mappillai Gounder (Prabhu) is the son of a rich landlord (Vinu Chakravarthy) living in a village. Subramani dreams of marrying his niece Priya (Sakshi Shivanand) who lives in the US. Upon her return neither Priya nor her father (Nizhalgal Ravi) are interested in the wedding proposal with Subramani and this deteriorates Subramani's father's health. While Priya's father is on a business trip to Singapore, Subramani meets Priya in Chennai and convinces her to come to his village and stay for a few days with the hope of his father's health to improve. Priya does not like the village lifestyle initially, however she understands the good nature of Subramani and gradually falls for him. Meanwhile, there is Amsavalli (Swathi) who works at Subramani's home and she also falls in love with Subramani but does not express her feelings knowing Subramani's love for Priya but Subramani understands Amsavalli's feelings. Priya's father comes back from Singapore and gets furious knowing that Priya is with Subramani in his village and goes immediately to bring her back. Priya confesses her love for Subramani to her father and beyond a point, her father agrees for their wedding. Priya returns to the village but is shocked to see the wedding happening between Subramani and Amsavalli. Subramani says that village lifestyle will not suit Priya and convinces her to marry an educated guy as per her match. Finally Subramani and Amsavalli are united.

Cast
 Prabhu as Subramani aka Mapillai Gounder
 Sakshi Shivanand as Priya
 Swathi as Amsavalli
 Vadivelu as Muthan
 Vinu Chakravarthy
 Nizhalgal Ravi
 Master Mahendran as Young Subramani
Sabitha Anand as Shenbagam
Manivannan

Production
Thambi Ramaiah made his debut as an assistant director with the venture, assisting Manivasagam who had earlier made Sarathkumar's Nadodi Mannan (1995).

Soundtrack
Soundtrack was composed by Deva. Lyrics written by Kalidasan, Kamakodiyan, Ponniyin Selvan and Vetri Kondan.

References

1997 films
1990s Tamil-language films
Indian romantic drama films
Films scored by Deva (composer)
Films directed by Manivasagam
1997 romantic drama films